Lewisia oppositifolia is a rare species of flowering plant in the family Montiaceae known by the common name opposite-leaf lewisia. It is native to the Klamath Mountains of Josephine County, Oregon, and Del Norte County, California, where it is a local serpentine endemic generally found in moist areas. This is a perennial herb growing from a small taproot and caudex unit. It produces a basal rosette of several lance-shaped, blunt-tipped fleshy leaves up to 11 centimeters long. There are sometimes smaller leaves located on the lower stem. The inflorescence is made up of one or more erect stems up to about 20 centimeters long, each bearing 1 to 6 flowers. The flower has 8 to 11 white to pale pink petals with blunt or jagged tips, each between 1 and 2 centimeters long. At the center are several stamens with pale anthers. This plant has a limited distribution and it is threatened by human activity in the area, such as logging.

External links

Jepson Manual Treatment
Photo gallery

oppositifolia
Flora of California
Flora of Oregon
Flora without expected TNC conservation status